This is a list of notable alumni of the Cooper Union for the Advancement of Science and Art.  Awards received by Cooper Union alumni include one Nobel Prize in Physics, a Pritzker Prize, fifteen Rome Prizes, 26 Guggenheim Fellowships, three MacArthur Fellowships, nine Chrysler Design Awards, three American Institute of Architects Thomas Jefferson Awards for Public Architecture, and one Queen Elizabeth Prize for Engineering. The school also boasts 39 Fulbright Scholars since 2001, and thirteen National Science Foundation Graduate Research Fellowships since 2004.

To ensure that this list remains useful to all, please refer to Wikipedia's standards for notability before adding anyone to this list.

A
 George G. Adams (engineer), mechanical engineer
 John Alcorn (1935–1992), illustrator
 Stan Allen, former Dean of the School of Architecture, Princeton University
 Daniel Arsham, artist, with alumnus Alex Mustonen established Snarkitecture
 David Attie (1920–1982), photographer

B
 Michael Bach (1908-2000), technical illustrator - North American Aviation P-51 Mustang 1940, artist - awarded silver medal by The American Institute of Fine Arts 1968, and entrepreneur
 Donald Baechler, painter
Firelei Báez, artist
 Alex Bag, video artist
 Elizabeth Gowdy Baker (1860–1927), portraitist
 Shigeru Ban, pioneer of "Paper Architecture"
 Karen Bausman, Rome Prize recipient, the only American woman architect to hold both the Eliot Noyes (Harvard) and Eero Saarinen (Yale) chairs
 Max Becher, artist and educator
 Lily Benson, filmmaker and visual artist
 Dave Berg (1920–2002), cartoon artist and main contributor of Mad magazine illustrations
 Renata Bernal, painter
 Theodore H. Berlin (1917-1962), theoretical physicist
 Emile Berliner (1851–1929), invented the vinyl record
 Billy Bitzer (1872–1944), cinematographer
 Victor Gustav Bloede (1849–1937), chemist and philanthropist; protege' of Peter Cooper
 Louise Brann (1906–1982), muralist
 Norman Bridwell (1928–2014), cartoonist and creator of Clifford the Big Red Dog
 Kadar Brock, contemporary abstract artist
 Steve Brodner, cartoonist
 Ronald Brookmeyer, public health researcher; professor of biostatistics at UCLA
 Dik Browne (1917–1989), cartoonist and creator of Hägar the Horrible
 Jennie Augusta Brownscombe (1850-1936), artist
Lee Brozgol (1941–2021), visual artist, educator, and social worke
 Kevin Burke, CEO of Consolidated Edison

C
 Albert Carnesale, former chancellor of UCLA and dean of the Kennedy School of Government at Harvard
 Alfred Clark (1873–1950), inventor, cinematic director, and media executive
 Martin Charnin (1934–2019), Tony Award-winning lyricist, writer, and theatre director
 Remy Charlip (1929–2012), choreographer, writer, and illustrator
 Ching Ho Cheng (1946–1989), artist
 John Walter Christie (1865–1944), engineer and inventor
 Seymour Chwast, graphic designer, co-founder of Push Pin Studios
 Guy Coheleach, wildlife artist
 Anna Conway, painter
 Miriam Cooper (1891–1976), actress
 E. Miriam Coyrière, educator and entrepreneur
 Will Cotton, painter
 William L. Coulter (1865–1907), architect
 Joshua Lionel Cowen (1877–1965), inventor of the flash-lamp and co-founder of Lionel Corporation
 Amy Cutler, artist

D
 Peggy Deamer, Emeritus Professor of Architecture at Yale
 Roy DeCarava (1919–2009), photographer
 William Francis Deegan (1882–1932), architect and political leader, namesake of the Major Deegan Expressway
 Bruce Degen, illustrator for The Magic School Bus
 Olvia C. Demetriou, architect, Fellow of the American Institute of Architects; Washington Design Center Hall of Fame  
 Freda Diamond (1905–1998), industrial designer known for designing mass market home goods
 Elizabeth Diller, with Ricardo Scofidio, the first architects to win a MacArthur Prize co-founder of Diller Scofidio + Renfro
 Michael Doret, graphic designer, font designer, lettering artist
 Lou Dorfsman (1918–2008), graphic designer art director for CBS
 Eric Drooker, painter and author
 William Dubilier (1888–1969), inventor of the mica capacitor and radio pioneer
 Clive Dym, chair of the engineering department at Harvey Mudd College; professor at Stanford

E
 John M. Eargle (1931–2007), Oscar and Grammy-winning audio engineer and musician
 Thomas Edison (1847–1931), inventor
 Allegra Eggleston (1860–1933), artist and illustrator
 Malachi Leo Elliott (1886-1967), architect 
 Jeffrey Epstein (1953–2019), financial advisor and convicted sex offender. Did not graduate.
 Mitch Epstein , photographer

F
 Isidor Fankuchen (1905-1964), material scientist and solid-state physicist; pioneer of crystallography
 Adriana Farmiga, visual artist and Assistant Dean at Cooper Union School of Art
 Robert Feintuch, painter
 Joel H. Ferziger (1937–2004), mechanical engineer and expert in computational fluid dynamics
 Anthony Fiala (1869-1950), American explorer
 Irving Fierstein (1915–2009), painter, designer
Liana Finck, cartoonist and author
 Israel F. Fischer (1858–1940), US Representative, judge
 James Fitzgerald (1851-1922), American jurist and politician
 Thom Fitzgerald, filmmaker
 Audrey Flack, pioneer of photorealism
 Max Fleischer (1883–1972), animator, inventor, film director and producer; co-creator of Betty Boop
 Mary Hallock Foote (1847–1938), author and illustrator
 Charles R. Forbes (1878–1952), politician and military officer; first Director of the US Veterans' Bureau
 Laura Ford, sculptor 
 Felix Frankfurter (1882–1965), Associate Justice of the Supreme Court of the United States 
 Brad Friedmutter, architect
 Martin Feinberg, chemical engineer and mathematician

G
 Janet Gardner, filmmaker
Lenora Garfinkel (1930–2020), architect
 Paul Garrin, filmmaker
Louis D. Gibbs, lawyer, politician, judge
 Philip Gips (1931–2019), film poster artist
 Milton Glaser (1929–2020), graphic designer, creator of the I Love New York logo, co-founder of Push Pin Studios
 Harold S. Goldberg, electrical engineer; first chair of the IEEE
 Minetta Good (1895–1946), muralist, painter and printmaker
 Harry H. Goode (1909-1960), computer engineer and systems engineer; professor at the University of Michigan
 Aaron Goodelman, sculptor
 Sidney Gordin (1918–1996), visual artist, professor
 T.J. Gottesdiener, architect and manager of Skidmore, Owings & Merrill
 Harold Grad (1923-1986), applied mathematician
 Aaron Green (1917-2001), architect and protege of Frank Lloyd Wright; lecturer at Stanford University
 Charles Greenfield (1885-1979), engineer
 Leonard Gross, mathematician; Professor Emeritus of Mathematics at Cornell University

H
 Hans Haacke, artist
 Dimitri Hadzi (1921–2006), sculptor
 William Harnett (1848–1892), painter
 Irving Harper (1916-2015), industrial designer 
 Matthew Harrison , film director
 Sagi Haviv, partner, Chermayeff & Geismar; designer of the Library of Congress and Armani Exchange logos
 Palmer Hayden (1890–1973), artist famous for depictions of African-American life
 John Hejduk (1929–2000), one of New York Five, a group of five New York City architects
 Eva Hesse (1936–1970), sculptor
 Angela Hill, professional mixed martial arts fighter
 Julian Hirsch (1922-2003), electrical engineer and audio critic
 Chuck Hoberman, winner of the Chrysler Design Award for Innovation and Design
 Kim Holleman, artist, MIT Media Lab Social Computing Group
 Emil Clemens Horst (1867-1940), inventor
 Shelby Hughes (1981–2014), artist and designer
 Russell Hulse, 1993 winner of the Nobel Prize in Physics

I
 Alexander Isley, graphic designer

J
 Francis Jehl (1860–1941), electrochemist and inventor
 Patty Jenkins, filmmaker
 Herman Jessor (1894-1990), architect and engineer
 Sandy Jimenez, comic book artist
 Bonnie E. John, cognitive psychologist
 Crockett Johnson (1906–1975), (David Johnson Leisk), comic strip artist and author of Harold and the Purple Crayon
 Willard F. Jones (1890–1967), naval architect, head of National Safety Council's marine section and Vice President of Gulf Oil
 Mimi Jung (born 1981), artist

K
 Bob Kane (1915–1998), comic book artist and writer, creator of Batman
 Gideon Kanner, law professor, consultant, author, and lecturer 
 Michael Kasha (1920–2013), physical chemist, educator, and guitar designer
 Alex Katz, figurative artist
 Luke A. Keenan (1872-1924), politician
 Arthur C. Keller (1901-1983), electrical engineer; pioneer of recording technologies
 Otto Kempner (1858-1914), lawyer, politician, and judge
 Owen M. Kiernan, member of the New York State Assembly
 Owen Kildare (1864-1911), realist writer
 Dave King, novelist and poet
 William King (1925–2015), artist
 R.B. Kitaj (1932–2007), painter
 Murray S. Klamkin (1921-2004), mathematician
 Vera Klement, professor at the University of Chicago
 Randy Klinger, Artist, Prince Street Gallery, Founder/Director: Moray Art Centre, Scotland
 Herman Charles Koenig (18931959), book collector, friend of H. P. Lovecraft
 Fred Kohler, inventor, author, and lecturer 
 Lee Krasner (1908–1984), painter
 Kathleen Kucka, painter
 Heather Kulik, computational materials scientist and chemical engineer; professor at the Massachusetts Institute of Technology
 Moses Kunitz (1887-1978), biochemist
 Harvey Kurtzman (1924–1993), cartoonist, editor and co-founder of Mad

L
 Marisa Lago, attorney; Under Secretary of Commerce for International Trade
 Alfred A. Lama (1899–1984), New York State Assemblyman and co-sponsor of Mitchell-Lama housing legislation
 Thomas W. Lamb (1871–1942), architect and designer of theaters and cinemas
 Morgan Foster Larson (1882–1961), Governor of New Jersey, 1929–1932
 Benjamin Lax (1915-2015), solid-state and plasma physicist
 Joseph Lechleider (1933-2015), electrical engineer; inventor of DSL technology
 Aaron J. Levy (1881-1955), lawyer and politician 
 Janet Cook Lewis, painter, librarian, and bookbinder
 Daniel Libeskind , architect for the reconstruction of the World Trade Center
 Whitfield Lovell, artist
 Herb Lubalin (1918–1981), graphic designer, creative director for publications Eros, Fact, and Avant Garde; designed the typeface ITC Avant Garde
 Samuel Lubkin (1906-1972), mathematician and computer scientist; pioneer in the early history of computing
 Ellen Lupton, graphic designer, writer, curator and educator
 Noah Lyon, artist

M
 Jay Maisel, photographer
 Sylvia Plimack Mangold
 Fred Marcellino (1939–2001), illustrator
 Christian Marclay, artist, composer
 Judith Margolis, artist, essayist, book designer, curator
 Joseph Margulies (1896–1984), artist
 Jacob Marks (1861–1965), lawyer, New York State Senator, Municipal Court Justice
 Leonidas D. Marinelli (1906-1974), radiological physicist; founded the field of Human Radiobiology
 Alexia Massalin, computer scientist and programmer
 Crystal McKenzie, designer
 Antonina Roll-Mecak, molecular biophyicist; Chief of the Unit of Cell Biology and Biophysics at the National Institutes of Health
 Linn Meyers, artist
 Abbott Miller, designer 
 Mike Mills, filmmaker
 Matthew Monahan, sculptor
 A. Harry Moore (1877–1952), 39th Governor of New Jersey
 Toshiko Mori, architect
 Jacqueline Moss (1927–2005), art historian, educator
 P. Buckley Moss, artist
 Michel Mossessian, architect
 James H. Mulligan Jr. (1920–1996), American electrical engineer, former executive officer of National Academy of Engineering and president of IEEE 
 Thomas Maurice Mulry (1855–1916), businessman and philanthropist
 Wangechi Mutu, artist
 Henry L. Myers (1862-1943), United States senator

N
 Roy Nachum, Israeli New York-based contemporary artist
 Willa Nasatir (born 1990) BFA 2012, photographer, visual artist
 Victor Nellenbogen (1888–1959), architect
 Vera Neumann (1907–1993), artist known for colored linen patterns and scarves signed "Vera" by the Vera Company

O
 Ella Seaver Owen (1852–1910), artist, teacher

P
 Victor Papanek (1923–1998), designer and educator; early proponent of ecologically and socially responsible design
 Bruce Pasternack (1947–2021), engineer, author, and President and CEO of the Special Olympics
 Randolph Perkins (1871-1936), Republican US Congressman
 Eleanore Pettersen (1916–2003), architect
 William Gardner Pfann (1917–1982), inventor and materials scientist; known for his development of zone melting
 Sylvia Plevritis, professor and chair of the Department of Biomedical Data Science at Stanford University 
 Robert Plonsey (1924-2015), electrical engineer; Pfizer-Pratt Professor of Biomedical Engineering at Duke University; known for his work in Bioelectricity 
 Ron Pompei, architect and founder of Pompei A.D.
 Charles E. Pont (1898–1971), painter, illustrator, printmaker, graphic designer
 Neal Pozner (1955–1994), artist, editor, writer and designer at DC Comics
 Seth Putterman, physicist

Q

R
 Grace Renzi (1922-2011), painter
 Andrea Robbins, artist and educator
 Morgan Robertson (1861-1915), American writer and self-proclaimed inventor of the periscope
 Frank E. Rom (1926-2012), NASA engineer
 Otto A. Rosalsky (1873-1936), lawyer and judge
 Fred Rosebury (1901-1999), engineer and artist
 Charles Rosen (1917–2002), engineer and pioneer in artificial intelligence in development of Shakey the Robot
 Reynold Ruffins, graphic designer, co-founder of Push Pin Studios
 Jere F. Ryan (1882-1948), builder, businessman, and politician

S
 Amy Sadao, Daniel Dietrich II Director of the Institute of Contemporary Art
 Augustus Saint-Gaudens (1848–1907), Beaux-Arts sculptor, numismatist, and educator
 Karen Sandler, lawyer
 Erik Sanko, marionette-maker and leader of the rock band Skeleton Key
 Alfred Sarant (1918–1979), engineer and Soviet spy
 Edward Sargent (1842–1914), architect
 Richard Sarles, CEO and General Manager of Washington Metropolitan Area Transit Authority
 Augusta Savage (Augusta Christine Fells) (1892-1962), sculptor and teacher
 Henry Scheffé (1907-1977), statistician; known for the Lehmann-Scheffe theorem and Scheffe's method
 Arnold Alfred Schmidt, painter
 Mischa Schwartz, professor of electrical engineering, Columbia University 
 Richard Schwartz, engineer, shared the 2019 Queen Elizabeth Prize for Engineering for design and development of the first GPS satellites.
 Sy Schulman (1926–2012), civil engineer and planner, Mayor of White Plains, New York (1993–1997)
 Ricardo Scofidio, with Elizabeth Diller, the first architects to win a MacArthur Prize, co-founder of Diller Scofidio + Renfro
 Samuel R. Scottron (1841–1908), engineer and inventor, grandfather of entertainer Lena Horne
 Georgette Seabrooke (1916–2011), muralist, artist, art therapist and educator
 George Segal (1924–2000), Pop Art sculptor and painter
 Emily McGary Selinger (1848–1927), painter, writer, poet, educator
 Redmond Simonsen (1942–2005), graphic artist and game designer at the wargame company Simulations Publications, Inc.
 Neal Slavin, photographer
 John L. Smith (1889–1950), chemist, pharmaceutical executive, and co-owner of the Brooklyn Dodgers
 Zak Smith, artist
 Charles B.J. Snyder (1860–1945), chief architect and Superintendent of School Buildings, New York City Board of Education, 1891–1923
 Edward Sorel, graphic designer, co-founder of Push Pin Studios
 Mark A. Stamaty, cartoonist and children's writer and illustrator
 Edwin King Stodola (1914–1992), radio engineer; chief scientist on Project Diana, which bounced radio waves off the moon for the first time in 1946
 Thaddeus Strassberger, opera director
 William Sulzer (1863-1941), 39th governor of New York
 Eric E. Sumner (1923–1993), engineer, inventor, and scientist; contributor to the early development of switching systems

T
 Philip Taaffe, painter
 Katharine Lamb Tait (1895–1981), artist
Nina Tandon, bioengineer and educator
 Adah Belle Thoms (1870-1943), founder of the National Association of Colored Graduate Nurses 
 Maximilian Toch (1864–1946), chemist, manufacturer, educator, and early pioneer of art forensics
 Hy Turkin (1915–1955), sportswriter and editor of the first baseball encyclopedia

U
 Andrea U'Ren, children's book author and illustrator

V
 Jaret Vadera, artist
 Stan Vanderbeek (1927–1984), animator
 Henry Earle Vaughan (1912-1978), electrical engineer
 Richard Velazquez, Honda and Porsche car designer
 Allyson Vieira, artist
 Jovan Karlo Villalba, painter
 Harold Van Buren Voorhis (1894-1983), chemist

W
 Louis Waldman (1892–1982), engineer, labor lawyer, a founding member of the Social Democratic Federation
 Annie E. A. Walker (1855–1929), portrait artist, one of the first African-American women to complete an institutional art education in the US
 Edward J. Wasp (1923–2015), chemical and environmental engineer, pioneer of slurry pipelines
 Adolph Alexander Weinman (1870–1952), sculptor
 Joseph Weber (1919-2000), American physicist
 Tom Wesselmann (1931–2004), painter
 Pennerton West (1913–1965), painter
 Alice Wetterlund, comedian
 Jack Whitten (1939–2018), painter
 Christopher Wilmarth (1943–1987), sculptor 
 Jerome Witkin, painter
 Joel-Peter Witkin, fine art photographer
 Dan Witz, painter, street artist
 Tobi Wong (1974–2010), designer, artist
 Caroline Woolard, artist
 Sarah A. Worden Lloyd (1855-1918), painter, art instructor

X

Y
 Jackie Yi-Ru Ying, chemical engineer, nanotechnology scientist, and educator
 Prabda Yoon, writer

Z

References